Znetalici was a Slavic tribe mentioned by the 9th-century Bavarian Geographer. They are mentioned as inhabiting 74 civitates (settlements).

While some scholars put them somewhere in Russia, between the Carpathians and the Danube, or in Kiev. the majority located them in Bohemia and near Lusatia. They are etymologically related to toponym Netolice in Bohemia, and Serbo-Lusatian tribe of Neletici or Netelici. Mikołaj Rudnicki considered it of patronymic origin with suffix *-ici, deriving it from *Snetal ("big trunk"), which has survived as surnames Snětal, Snětalová in the Czech Republic and Śniatała in Poland.

References

Sources

Slavic tribes